Idriss Saadi (born 8 February 1992) is a professional footballer who last played for CR Belouizdad. He operates primarily in the lead striker role. A former France youth international, Saadi now represents Algeria internationally after making his senior debut in 2017.

Club career

Saint-Étienne
Saadi started his professional career at Saint-Étienne, making his professional debut on 28 August 2010 in a league match against Lens in a 3–1 victory.

During his time at Saint-Étienne, Saadi had loan spells at Reims and Ajaccio.

Clermont Foot
In January 2014, Saadi joined Ligue 2 side Clermont, where he impressed with 20 goals in 42 games.

Cardiff City

On 31 August 2015, Saadi joined Championship side Cardiff City for an undisclosed fee. Manager Russell Slade stated that the club had been scouting Saadi for several months and described him as strong, powerful and technically good. Due to an injury picked up the previous season, Saadi didn't make his debut till 7 November 2015, in a 2–0 win over Reading, where he had lasted 13 minutes before suffering another injury ruling him out for another 6 weeks. He made just one more substitute appearance during his first season at the Cardiff City Stadium, during a 2–1 defeat to Fulham on 9 April.

Loan to Kortrijk
In July 2016, Saadi joined Belgian side Kortrijk on loan. He made his debut in a 1–1 draw with Gent and went on to score his first and second goal against Club Brugge on 20 August.

Strasbourg
On 21 July 2017, Saadi joined Strasbourg for an undisclosed fee.

CR Belouizdad
On 5 July 2022, Saadi joined CR Belouizdad.

International career
Saadi is a former youth international for France. He debuted for the Algeria national football team in a friendly 1–0 win over Guinea on 6 June 2017.

Career statistics

Club

References

External links
 
 
 
 
 

Living people
1992 births
Sportspeople from Valence, Drôme
Footballers from Auvergne-Rhône-Alpes
Association football forwards
Algerian footballers
Algeria international footballers
French footballers
France youth international footballers
French sportspeople of Algerian descent
Algerian expatriates in Belgium
Algerian expatriates in France
AS Saint-Étienne players
Stade de Reims players
Gazélec Ajaccio players
Clermont Foot players
Cardiff City F.C. players
K.V. Kortrijk players
RC Strasbourg Alsace players
Cercle Brugge K.S.V. players
Ligue 1 players
Ligue 2 players
English Football League players
Belgian Pro League players
Expatriate footballers in Wales
Expatriate footballers in Belgium